Wirehead may refer to:

 Wirehead (science fiction)
 Wirehead (video game), a Sega CD game based on the science fiction concept
 WireHead, a musical band formed in 2007 by Clive Edwards